The K130 Braunschweig class (sometimes Korvette 130) is Germany's newest class of ocean-going corvettes.

In October 2016 it was announced that a second batch of five more corvettes, originally to be procured from 2022–2025 but now reportedly delayed. The decision was in response to NATO requirements expecting Germany to provide a total of four corvettes at the highest readiness level for littoral operations by 2018, and with only five corvettes just two can be provided.

Technical details
They feature reduced radar and infrared signatures ("stealth" beyond the capabilities of those of the s), and will be equipped with two helicopter UAVs for remote scouting. The German Navy ordered a first batch of two UMS Skeldar V-200 systems for the use on the Braunschweig-class corvettes. The hangar is too small for standard helicopters, but the pad is large enough for Sea Kings, Lynx, or NH-90s, the helicopters of the German Navy.

The Polyphem program was cancelled in 2003 and instead the designers chose to equip the class with the RBS-15. The German Navy had ordered the RBS-15 Mk4 in advance, which is a development of the Mk3 with increased range —— and a dual seeker for increased resistance to electronic countermeasures. The RBS-15 Mk3 has the capability to engage land targets.

Difficulty of classification
Vessels of this class do not have an executive officer. Traditionally, in the German Navy, this was used as a rule to classify a vessel as a boat, not a ship. In a press release, the German Navy stated that these corvettes will be called ships nonetheless because of their size, armament, and endurance.  The commanding officer wields the same disciplinary power as a German Army company commander, not that of a battalion commander as is the case with the larger German warships such as frigates. However, in size, armament, protection, and role, these corvettes resemble modern antisurface warfare  light frigates, the main difference being the total absence of any antisubmarine warfare  related sensors or weapons.

Contracting
The contract for first five ships was awarded in December 2001 Blohm+Voss, at that time owned by ThyssenKrupp Marine Systems, Nordseewerke, and Friedrich Lurssen Werft. The first ship, the Braunschweig, built at Blohm+Voss, was launched in April 2006 and was commissioned in April 2008.  The second ship was commissioned in 2008. The final three ships in Batch I were commissioned in 2013. Severe problems with the gearing provided by MAAG GmbH of Winterthur, Switzerland, delayed the commissioning of the corvettes. Further issues occurred with the air-conditioning system and exposure to toxins from exhaust and missile systems.

In May 2015, the Israeli government ordered four s, whose design by ThyssenKrupp Marine Systems will be loosely based on that of the Braunschweig-class corvette, but with engineering changes to render the baseline platform more militarily robust.

In April 2017, the German government announced a contract for a further five ships to the same group as before, but the process under which it had been awarded was challenged at the German Federal Cartel Office by the German Naval Yards and the contract was voided in May.

In September 2017, the German Navy commissioned the construction of five more corvettes in a consortium of North German shipyards. Lürssen will be the main contractor in the production of the vessels. The contract is worth around 2 billion euros.  In April 2018, the German government announced the specific arrangements under which the five new K130s would be built.

Plans to build a third batch (i.e. ships 11–15) are under consideration, ships from the first batch (i.e. ships 1–5) would be decommissioned from 2025 and sold to a NATO ally in order to avoid modernization costs.

In September 2022 it was reported that increasing difficulties in integrating the command and control systems for the Batch 2 ships had resulted in a cost growth of 401 million Euros and at least a two year delay for the completion of the lead Batch 2 vessel, and potentially cascading delays for the next two ships in the Batch 2 program as well.

Ships in class
The ships were not built at a single shipyard; sections were constructed at different locations at the same time and later married together.  The table lists the yard where the keel-laying ceremonies were held. Due to the decommissioning of the Gepard class, five additionally being constructed from 2019–2025.

Images

See also
 
 List of naval ship classes in service

References

Bibliography

External links

 Korvette Braunschweig-Klasse @ Marine (official homepage of the German Navy)
 Manufacturer's website

Corvette classes
Stealth ships
Braunschweig-class corvettes